I May Destroy You is a British black comedy-drama television limited series created, written, co-directed, and executive produced by Michaela Coel for BBC One and HBO. The series is set in London with a predominantly Black British cast. Coel stars as Arabella, a young writer in the public eye who seeks to rebuild her life after being raped. The series premiered on 7 June 2020 on HBO and on 8 June 2020 on BBC One.

According to Metacritic, I May Destroy You was the most critically acclaimed television programme of 2020, and was described by The New York Times as "the perfect show for an anxious world." It won the BAFTAs for Best Mini-Series, Best Director: Drama, Best Writer: Drama and Best Actress, in addition to two RTS Programme Awards, two Independent Spirit Awards, a Gotham Award, a GLAAD Media Award, an NAACP Image Award and a Peabody Award.

The series received nine nominations at the 73rd Primetime Emmy Awards, including Outstanding Limited or Anthology Series; it won two awards including Outstanding Writing for Coel.

Premise
Arabella (Michaela Coel) is a young Twitter-star-turned-novelist in her late twenties who found fame with her debut book Chronicles of a Fed-Up Millennial and is publicly celebrated as a Millennial icon. While struggling to meet a deadline for her second book, she takes a break from work to meet up with friends on a night out in London. The following morning, she struggles to remember what happened to her, but recalls the events of the night with the help of her friends Terry (Weruche Opia) and Kwame (Paapa Essiedu).

Cast and characters

Main
 Michaela Coel as Arabella Essiedu, a writer
 Weruche Opia as Terry Pratchard, Arabella's best friend and a struggling actor
 Paapa Essiedu as Kwame, Arabella's best friend

Recurring

 Marouane Zotti as Biagio, a drug dealer based in Ostia, Italy, who has a casual relationship with Arabella
 Stephen Wight as Ben, Arabella's flatmate
 Adam James as Julian, Arabella's literary agent
 Natalie Walter as Francine, Arabella's financier
 Aml Ameen as Simon, Arabella's friend who works in the City of London
 Lara Rossi as Kat, Simon's partner
 Ann Akin as Alissa, Simon's secret lover
 Chin Nyenwe as Tariq, David's friend
 Lewis Reeves as David, from Ego Death
 Sarah Niles as Officer Funmi
 Mariah Gale as Officer Beth
 Rebecca Calder as Shirley, a rape victim who meets Arabella at the hospital
 Andi Osho as Carrie, Arabella's therapist
 Fehinti Balogun as Damon, Kwame's love interest
 Karan Gill as Zain Sareen, writer from Henny publishing
 Samson Ajewole as Malik, Kwame's hookup
 Tobi King Bakare as Nicholas, Arabella's brother
 Ellie James as Sion, Susy's assistant
 Franc Ashman as Susy Henny, Arabella's publisher
 Harriet Webb as Theodora, Arabella and Terry's childhood classmate
 Shalisha James-Davis as Loretta, a member of Theodora's support group 
 Gaby French as teen Theodora
 Danielle Vitalis as teen Arabella
 Lauren-Joy Williams as teen Terry
 Pearl Chanda as Nilufer, Kwame's first female hookup
 Gershwyn Eustache Jnr as Tyrone, one of Kwame's hookups
 Tyler Luke Cunningham as Kai, Terry's love interest

Notable guests

 Katherine Jakeways as Jacki
 Juno Dawson as Scarlett

 Kadiff Kirwan as Officer Tom

 Antonia Clarke as Emily

 Vivian Oparah as Bisola

 Jonathan Slinger as doctor

Episodes

Release
The series premiered on 8 June 2020 on BBC One in the United Kingdom. The first episode had already premiered in advance on 7 June 2020 on HBO in the United States.

Production
Coel stated in a lecture at the 2018 Edinburgh Festival Fringe that she had been sexually assaulted while writing Chewing Gum, and that the experience provided inspiration for the series.

Originally titled January 22nd, the series is produced by Coel's production company, FALKNA Productions. It is executive produced by Coel, Phil Clarke, Roberto Troni, and Jo McClellan for BBC One. Coel is also co-director and writer for I May Destroy You. Coel turned down a $1 million (£800,000) offer from Netflix for the show because the deal would have taken full rights ownership away from the creator. Coel subsequently made a deal with the BBC which allowed Coel full creative control and ownership rights of her project and the BBC brought on HBO as a co-producer to help fund the project.

The series was predominantly filmed in the London Borough of Hackney with some scenes filmed in Italy.

School interior and exteriors for the flashback scenes were shot at Acland Burghley School in the London Borough of Camden.

Critical response
I May Destroy You  holds an average score of 86 out of 100 based on reviews from 25 critics on review aggregator Metacritic, indicating "universal acclaim". On Rotten Tomatoes, 97% of 72 reviews are positive, with an average score of 8.55/10. The website's critical consensus is, "I May Destroy You is at once brave and delicate, untangling the trauma of sexual assault with dark humour and moments of deep discomfort all held together on the strength of Michaela Coel's undeniable talent."

Writing for The New York Times, critic Mike Hale called the series "touching and quietly hilarious." He praised Coel and the show's willingness to push boundaries. In her review for Time, critic Judy Berman noted the show's unique and complex telling of a story centred on sexual assault after the Me Too movement.

French newspaper Le Monde includes I May Destroy You in its Top 10 of the best 2020 TV shows.

The show featured heavily on year-end lists. Metacritic listed it as the best TV show of the year based on critic top 10 lists, with more than thirty #1 placements.

Awards and nominations

Notes

References

External links
 
 I May Destroy You on HBO
 

2020 British television series debuts
2020 British television series endings
2020s British LGBT-related drama television series
2020s British television miniseries
BBC Television shows
Black British television shows
HBO original programming
Rape in television
Television shows about writers
Television series about social media
Television shows set in London